The 2015 ICC World Cricket League Division Two was a cricket divisional tournament organised by the International Cricket Council. It formed part of the ICC World Cricket League and a qualification pathway for the ICC World Cup 2019.

The tournament was held in Namibia from 17 to 24 January 2015. The Netherlands won the tournament, beating hosts Namibia by 8 wickets in the final.

Teams
The teams that took part in the tournament were decided according to the results of the 2014 World Cup Qualifier and the 2014 ICC World Cricket League Division Three.

Squads

Fixtures

All times are Namibia Standard Time (UTC+02:00) at NST

Round robin

Points table

Points system:

In the event of teams finishing on equal points, the right to play in the final match or series was determined as follows:
The team with the highest number of wins 
If still equal, the team with the highest net run rate

In a match declared as no result, run rate is not applicable.

Won (W): 2
Lost (L): 0
No result (NR): 1
Tie (T): 1

Net run rate (NRR): Runs per over scored less runs per over conceded, adjusting team batting first to overs of team batting second in rain rule matches, adjusting to team's full allocation if all out, and ignoring no result matches.

Matches
All matches are scheduled to start at 09:30 local time

Playoffs

5th place playoff

3rd place playoff

Final

Statistics

Most runs
The top five run scorers (total runs) are included in this table.

Source: Cricinfo

Most wickets
The top five wicket takers (total wickets) are listed in this table.

Source: Cricinfo

Final placings

After the conclusion of the tournament the teams were distributed as follows:

References

External links
 Series Home at ESPN Cricinfo

International cricket competitions in Namibia
Sport in Windhoek
2015, 2
2015 in cricket
Cricket, World Cricket League Division 2
21st century in Windhoek